The 2012–13 George Mason Patriots men's basketball team represented George Mason University during the 2012–13 NCAA Division I men's basketball season.  This was the 47th season for the program.  The Patriots, led by head coach Paul Hewitt, were members of the Colonial Athletic Association and played their home games at the Patriot Center, with one home game at the Recreation and Athletic Complex. They finished the season 22–16, 10–8 in CAA play to finish in a tie for fifth place. They advanced to the semifinals of the CAA tournament where they lost to Northeastern. They were invited to the 2013 College Basketball Invitational where they defeated the College of Charleston, Houston, and Western Michigan to advance to the best-of-three games finals series vs Santa Clara. They lost the series to Santa Clara 2 games to 1 to be the CBI Runner-Up.

This was the Patriots final season as a member of the CAA. They joined the Atlantic 10 Conference in July, 2013.

Awards
Second Team All-CAA
 Sherrod Wright

CAA Player of the Week
 Bryon Allen - Nov. 12
 Sherrod Wright - Dec. 24

Roster

.  https://web.archive.org/web/20140407063544/http://m.gomason.com/mobile/ViewArticle.dbml?atclid=205055885&DB_MENU_ID=&SPSID=&SPID=&DB_OEM_ID=25200

Stats

Game log

|-
!colspan=12 style=| Exhibition

|-
!colspan=12 style=| Non-conference regular season

|-
!colspan=12 style=|<span style=>CAA regular season

|-
!colspan=12 style=|CAA tournament

|-
!colspan=12 style=|College Basketball Invitational

Recruiting
The following is a list of players signed for the 2013–14 season:

References

George Mason Patriots men's basketball seasons
George Mason
George Mason
George Mason
George Mason